The 2018–19 season was the 117th season of competitive association football in Spain.

Promotion and relegation

Pre-season

National teams

Spain national football team

Friendly matches

2018 FIFA World Cup

Group B

Round of 16

2018–19 UEFA Nations League A

Group 4

UEFA Euro 2020 qualifying

Group F

Spain women's national football team

Friendly matches

2019 FIFA Women's World Cup qualification (UEFA)

Group 7

Algarve Cup

Group B

7th Place

2019 FIFA Women's World Cup

Group B

Knockout stage

FIFA competitions

2018 FIFA Club World Cup

Semi-finals

Final

UEFA competitions

2018–19 UEFA Champions League

Group stage

Group A

Group B

Group G

Group H

Knockout phase

Round of 16

|}

Quarter-finals

|}
Notes

Semi-finals

|}

2018–19 UEFA Europa League

Qualifying phase and play-off round

Second qualifying round

|}

Third qualifying round

|}

Play-off round

|}

Group stage

Group F

Group G

Group J

Round of 32

|}

Knockout phase

Round of 16

|}

Quarter-finals

|}

Semi-finals

|}

2018 UEFA Super Cup

2018–19 UEFA Youth League

UEFA Champions League Path

Group A

Group B

Group G

Group H

Knockout phase

Round of 16

|}

Quarter-finals

|}

Semi-finals

|}

2018–19 UEFA Women's Champions League

Knockout phase

Round of 32

|}

Round of 16

|}

Quarter-finals

|}

Semi-finals

|}

Final

The final was played on 18 May 2019 at the Groupama Arena in Budapest. The "home" team for the final (for administrative purposes) was determined by an additional draw held after the quarter-final and semi-final draws.

Men's football

League season

La Liga

Segunda División

Promotion play-offs

Segunda División B

Group champions' play-offs

Cup competitions

Copa del Rey

Final

Supercopa de España

Copa Federación de España 

|}

Women's football

League season

Primera División

Segunda División

Promotion playoffs

Cup competitions

Copa de la Reina

Final

References

External links
La Liga
Royal Spanish Football Federation

 
Football
Football
Spain
Spain